ReveNews is an online publication founded in December 1998 by independent digital media firm GMD Studios and the original team of Brian Clark, J.D. Ashcraft and Wayne Porter. ReveNews publishes articles focused on Internet-related industries such as online marketing, search engine optimization marketing, affiliate marketing, retail (e-commerce), analytics, spyware, blogging, online revenue-sharing approaches, advertising networks, security issues, and the legal landscape. Along with the founders it featured regular contributions from such authors like Joel Comm.

ReveNews is an Ad Age Power 150 news blog.

Since its foundation ReveNews has changed publishers and owners several times. Jim Kukral took over as managing editor and publisher in June 2005 through March 2007. Sam Harrelson was managing editor and publisher from March 2007 to March 2008 after ReveNews and CostPerNews were acquired by incuBeta, a joint venture between Vinny Lingham, Wayne Porter, and Sam Harrelson. In 2008, Vinny Lingham bought the company from Wayne Porter and Sam Harrelson, taking over as ReveNewss publisher from March 2008 until November 2009. Vinny Lingham spent time looking for a buyer and entered into brief talks with Jeremy Schoemaker to purchase the publication.

In May 2008, Angel Djambazov became the managing editor of ReveNews after spending a brief stint as editor-in-chief and later became publisher and owner in November 2009. In January 2010, Missy Ward, co-founder of Affiliate Summit, joined the team as co-publisher of ReveNews.

ReveNews has received numerous mentions from peer sites like ZDnet and Cnet as well as mainstream media mentions including the New York Times and the Wall Street Journal. It also received Marketing Sherpa's Reader's Pick Best Blog Awards for 2006. ReveNews managing editors Jim Kukral and Sam Harrelson also won the Affiliate Summit Pinnacle Award for Best Blogger in 2007 and 2008. ReveNews has an iTunes application.

References

External links 
 http://www.linkedin.com/in/wayneporter
 http://www.samharrelson.com/2007/08/30/new-revenews/
 http://www.linkedin.com/in/gmdclark
http://www.revenews.com/about-revenews/
http://www.jimkukral.com/i-just-resigned-from-revenews/
http://www.missyward.com/about/
 Affiliate Summit
http://adage.com/power150/index?start=50&sort=total&order=desc&kwd=
 Ad Age
http://www.revenews.com/vinnylingham/new-revenewscom-editor-in-chief/

Companies based in Seattle
Online mass media companies of the United States